The 2015 African Junior Athletics Championships was the twelfth edition of the biennial, continental athletics tournament for African athletes aged 19 years or younger. It was held at the Addis Ababa Stadium in Addis Ababa, Ethiopia from 5–8 March. It was the first time that Ethiopia hosted the event and followed on from the 2008 African Championships in Athletics, which was hosted at the same venue.

As part of the preparations for the event, the Ethiopian government paid five million Ethiopian birr (around US$250,000) to renovate the host stadium's athletics facilities. The Ethiopian Minister for sport, Abdissa Yadeta, cited the improved international image and promotion of athletics internally as the justifications for the investment. The Ethiopian Broadcasting Corporation held the rights to broadcast the competition and its opening and closing ceremonies on television in the host country, while a French broadcaster held the worldwide broadcasting rights.

The Confederation of African Athletics hosted its two-day congress in the city's African Union Hall, prior to the championships; the serving president Hamad Kalkaba Malboum was re-elected for a third term. Cultural events were also staged alongside the sports competition, with the Ethiopian National Theatre holding concerts to promote the nation's music. Reflecting concern around the Ebola virus epidemic in West Africa, all foreign delegations were screened for the virus upon arrival. The total budget for the hosting costs of the championships (excluding the stadium investment) was estimated at 30 million Ethiopian birr (around USD$1.5 million).

Mohamed Magdi Hamza (men's shot put) and Joshua Kiprui Cheptegei (men's 10,000 metres) both set championship records. Cheptegei and Yomif Kejelcha won the same long-distance events as they had at the 2014 World Junior Championships in Athletics. Divine Oduduru, the 2013 men's 200 metres champion, returned and defended his title and expanded his honours include the 100 metres and 4×100 metres relay gold medals. Reigning Commonwealth Games champion, Ese Brume defended her long jump title with a championship record mark and was the stand-out athlete of the meeting, winning this title as well as a triple jump gold, 100 m bronze, and 4×100 m gold with Nigeria (also in a championship record). Dawit Seyaum was the third athlete to return and defend their title, doing so in the women's 1500 metres, and also the third reigning World Junior champion to win at the meet.

Medal table

Medal summary

Men

Women

 The women's 4×400 m relay had three entering teams Nigeria, Ethiopia and Kenya, but the bronze medal was not awarded as the Kenya team were disqualified.

References

Results
Full results
Ouma, Mark (2015-03-06). Khoua, Kibiwot, Beriso, Kaytlin, Geel, bag gold medals at African Junior Athletics champs-Day One. African Athletics. Retrieved on 2015-03-07.
Ouma, Mark (2015-03-07). Egyptian Magdy sets African Junior record-Day Two African Junior champs. African Athletics. Retrieved on 2015-03-07.
Ouma, Mark (2015-03-08). Nigerian women set championship record as Egypt clinch three gold medals-African Junior champs Day Three. African Athletics. Retrieved on 2015-03-11.
Ouma, Mark (2015-03-09). Nigerian defending champions Brume, Oduduru prevail-African Junior Champs Day Four. African Athletics. Retrieved on 2015-03-11.

African Junior Athletics Championships
African Junior Athletics Championships
African Junior Athletics Championships
Junior Athletics Championships
International athletics competitions hosted by Ethiopia
21st century in Addis Ababa
2015 in youth sport
March 2015 sports events in Africa